Nicholas A. Langworthy (born February 27, 1981) is an American politician serving as the U.S. representative for New York's 23rd district since 2023. He also chairs the New York State Republican Committee. Langworthy was named chair of the committee in July 2019 after having chaired the Erie County, New York Republican Committee since 2010. He is the youngest state chair in party history.

Early life
Langworthy was born in Jamestown, New York.  He attended the Pine Valley Central School in his hometown of South Dayton and graduated in 1999. After graduation, he attended Niagara University, where he established the university's branch of the College Republicans. He graduated from Niagara with a bachelor's degree in political science and chaired the New York College Republicans.

Early political career

Early career
After interning at Governor George Pataki's office and running a congressional campaign for Brett Sommer in 2000, Langworthy became a staffer for Congressman Thomas M. Reynolds. He managed Reynolds's successful reelection campaigns in 2004 and 2006. While working for Reynolds, Langworthy met his future wife, Erin Baker, who also worked on Reynolds's staff. Langworthy later managed the successful 2008 campaign of Representative Chris Lee and served as Lee's district office director until May 2010.

Langworthy is the founder and president of a polling firm, Liberty Opinion Research.

Erie County Republican Committee
Erie County Republican Committee Chair James P. Domagalski resigned his chairmanship in 2010 to run for the New York State Senate. An early front-runner for the county chairship, Langworthy made himself as visible as possible on the county and state Republican scenes. Langworthy unanimously won a special election for the chairship, becoming the youngest chair of either political party in Erie County's history. He was the only Republican county chair to endorse Carl Paladino in the Republican gubernatorial primary in 2010; he emerged as a political powerhouse when Paladino won the primary.  Paladino's primary upset, together with the Republicans' successful effort to take control of the Erie County legislature, led Buffalo News chief political columnist Bob McCarthy to call Langworthy the "GOP's Young Elder".

In 2016, President-elect Donald Trump announced that Langworthy would serve on the executive committee of his transition team. Langworthy had been a vocal supporter of Trump's presidential campaign.

In September 2019, it was announced that Langworthy would be succeeded as Erie County chair by Boston, New York Republican chair Karl J. Simmeth Jr.

New York State Republican Committee

In 2018, Langworthy began campaigning for the chairship of the New York State Republican Committee against incumbent state chairman Ed Cox. On May 20, 2019, after Monroe County Republican Chair Bill Reilich announced his support for Langworthy, Cox announced that he was withdrawing his candidacy for a new term as chair; the Democrat and Chronicle reported that Langworthy was "poised to become" the next chair of the Republican Committee. On July 1, 2019, Langworthy was named chair of the New York State Republican Committee. He is the youngest state chair in party history.

U.S. House of Representatives

Elections

2022 

In June 2022, U.S. Representative Chris Jacobs, who was running in New York's 23rd congressional district, announced that he would withdraw from the race and not seek reelection. Langworthy subsequently announced his candidacy for the seat, which represents part of Erie County and most of the Southern Tier. He won the August 24 Republican primary, defeating Carl Paladino. In the general election, Langworthy defeated Democratic nominee Max Della Pia.

Caucus memberships 

 Republican Main Street Partnership

Personal life
Langworthy's wife, Erin Baker Langworthy, ran unsuccessfully for Amherst, New York Town Board in 2017. She served as finance chair of the Erie County Republican Committee.

References

External links
 Congressman Nick Langworthy official U.S. House website
 Nick Langworthy for Congress

 

|-

|-

1981 births
21st-century American politicians
College Republicans
Living people
New York (state) Republicans
Niagara University alumni
People from Amherst, New York
Politicians from Jamestown, New York
Pollsters
Republican Party members of the United States House of Representatives from New York (state)
State political party chairs of New York (state)